The SS Charles Henderson was a Liberty ship built during World War II. It was destroyed in an ammunition explosion on 9 April 1945.

Namesake
One source states that the vessel was named for Charles Richmond Henderson (1848–1915), a Baptist clergyman and sociologist. Another source claims that it was named for Alabama Governor Charles Henderson.

Service
The vessel was operated for the War Shipping Administration by the Mississippi Shipping Company, New Orleans, from 1943.

On 21 January 1944, the Charles Henderson collided with the coastal tanker MV Plattsburgh Socony near Cape Henlopen, Delaware. The tanker caught fire as a result.  "Fourth Naval District officers said one of the ships burst into flames after the collision and was abandoned an hour later." One seaman was reported missing and four suffered burns. "A navy picket boat drew alongside the burning tanker – and 'stayed despite the danger of the ship exploding at any moment' – to rescue four crewmen marooned on the bow. Other survivors escaped in a lifeboat."

Loading in June 1944, the Charles Henderson was one of many vessels at Normandy for the invasion of Europe.

The ship sailed from New York City on 25 February 1945, bound for Norfolk, Virginia. There it loaded 6,675 tons of aircraft bombs in its holds. With loading complete, it steamed for Bari, Italy on 9 March, but returned the same day to repair its condenser's main induction valve. The ship waited five days for the next Mediterranean-bound convoy, UGS-80. Upon arriving at Gibraltar, the Charles Henderson proceeded independently to Bari, via Augusta, Sicily, arriving 5 April.

Fate
In one of the largest ammunition disasters of World War II, the Charles Henderson was being unloaded at berth 14 at Bari, in Southern Italy, on 9 April 1945, when she was destroyed in a high order explosion. "This detonation caused by [handling] 500 pound [230 kg] bombs loaded with Composition B, killed 542 and injured 1,800. It is believed the bombs were hooked and dragged to the well, then lifted without mats. The crew may have hurried because the contract paid by number of items lifted. Buildings along the waterfront were destroyed for 2,000 feet [610 m]. Ships were severely damaged to 2,100 feet [640 m]."

Thirty-nine crew and 13 Armed Guard were killed in the explosion. The only survivor was the chief engineer, who was ashore at the time of the blast. The wreck remained in Bari until 1948, when it was sold for scrap.

See also
Air raid on Bari

References

Liberty ships
Ships built in New Orleans
1943 ships
World War II merchant ships of the United States
Standard ship types of the United States